The 2001 Food City 500 was the sixth stock car race of the 2001 NASCAR Winston Cup Series season. It was held on March 25, 2001 at the Bristol Motor Speedway in Bristol, Tennessee. The 500-lap race was won by Elliott Sadler for the Wood Brothers Racing team; it was Sadler's first win in the Winston Cup Series and Wood Brothers Racing first since 1993, and the last until the 2011 Daytona 500 10 years later. John Andretti finished second and Jeremy Mayfield came in third.

Report

Background

The track, Bristol Motor Speedway, is one of five short tracks to hold NASCAR races; the others are Richmond International Raceway, Dover International Speedway, Martinsville Speedway, and Phoenix International Raceway. The track's turns are banked from twenty-four to thirty degrees, while both the front stretch (the location of the finish line) and the back stretch are banked from six to ten degrees. 

Before the race Dale Jarrett led the Drivers' Championship with 756 points, with Sterling Marlin and Johnny Benson Jr. tied for second place with 691 points each. Jeff Gordon and Steve Park rounded out the top five, and Ricky Rudd, Rusty Wallace, Michael Waltrip, Bill Elliott and Ken Schrader rounded out the top ten. In the Manufacturers' Championship, Chevrolet led with 42 points; Ford was second with 31 points. Pontiac was third with 19 points, with Dodge a close fourth with 17 points. Wallace was the race's defending champion.

References

2001 in sports in Tennessee
2001 NASCAR Winston Cup Series
NASCAR races at Bristol Motor Speedway